S. Raja Reddy is an Indian politician and was a Member of the Legislative Assembly of Tamil Nadu. He was elected to the Tamil Nadu legislative assembly as a Communist Party of India (CPI) candidate from Thalli constituency in the 1996 election. He is still a very famous for his kindness in the constituency, and he has got one daughter and two sisters and two brothers, he is very popular for non corruption and simplicity .

References 

Living people
Tamil Nadu MLAs 1996–2001
Communist Party of India politicians from Tamil Nadu
Year of birth missing (living people)